Arnaud's is a Creole restaurant in New Orleans, Louisiana, United States. It serves classic Creole dishes.

History
Arnaud's was founded in 1918 by a French wine salesman, Arnaud Cazenave. In 1978, 60 years after the restaurant opened, it was bought by Archie and Jane Casbarian. The Casbarian family restored the restaurant back to its original roots, the way founder Arnaud Cazenave would have intended, including renovating the building and updating the menu. These changes brought the restaurant positive recognition and widespread approval.

Present
Arnaud's is currently run by the fourth generation of the Casbarian family, Katy and Archie Casbarian, as well as their mother Jane. The family is committed to preserving the restaurant in the style of its founder, Arnaud Cazenave. Arnaud's signature dishes are also served at a more family-friendly cafe, Remoulade, located on Bourbon Street.

The present head chef at Arnaud's is Tommy DiGiovanni, who was born and raised in New Orleans.

After Katrina
Arnaud's restaurant was one of the first restaurants to reopen after Hurricane Katrina, which ripped through New Orleans in late August 2005. The restaurant re-opened in November 2005. "Many of our long-time employees have returned, and we'll all be celebrating," said owner Archie Casbarian of the opening. "The full menu will be available. Dining at Arnaud's is a true New Orleans experience, and we want to be true to our quality standards."

Private dining
Arnaud's has 14 different private dining rooms: Mezzanine, Creole Cottage, Bourbon Suites, Edison Park, 1920, Iberville, Bienville, Toulouse, Dauphine, Lafitte, Bacchus, Gold, Irma, and Count's. Each  room is furnished with a variety of antiques, chandeliers, and drapes, and can hold up to 220 people.

Food

Arnuad's is one of the few restaurants left in New Orleans to serve classic Creole food. Creole is an ethnic food of New Orleans, derived from French cuisine and typically includes  butter, pepper, salt, and herbs. The base ingredients in Creole and Cajun foods are the "Holy Trinity", a mirepoix of onions, bell peppers, and celery, which is cooked in a roux of butter and flour. The essence of Creole food is found in rich sauces, local herbs, red ripe tomatoes, and the prominent use of locally caught seafood. The cuisine may or may not be spicy.

Menus
Arnaud's has six menus: À La Carte Dinner Menu, Sunday Brunch and Jazz Menu, French 75 Menu, Table d'Hôte Menu, Dessert Menu, and Speakeasy.

Museum
The Germaine Cazenave Wells Mardi Gras Museum opened in 1983 and contains Mardi Gras artifacts all accumulated by Germaine Wells, the daughter of the original Arnaud, and the person for whom the museum is named.

French 75 Bar
The French 75 Bar located next to the main dining room of Arnaud's was strictly a gentlemen-only area when the Cazenave family owned the restaurant. The bar reverted to its original name, French 75 Bar, after being renovated in 2003.

See also

 List of Louisiana Creole restaurants
 List of oyster bars

References

External links
Arnaud's Website

Louisiana Creole restaurants in the United States
Louisiana Creole culture in New Orleans
Restaurants in New Orleans
Restaurants established in 1918
French Quarter
Oyster bars in the United States
1918 establishments in Louisiana